Vitunj is a small village in Karlovac, Croatia, a suburb of Ogulin.

Seven kilometers west of Ogulin at the river Vitunjčica, a tributary of the River Dobra (Kupa),
are the ruins of the medieval Frankopan city Vitunj, about which little is known, only that in 1575, the settlement was abandoned permanently. During the Ottoman incursions, the area was deserted until 1639, when Frankopans settled Vlachs from Petrova fields.

On the coast of the Vitunjčica River there is a small consumer trout fishing farm.

According to the Census of 2001, there were 141 residents of Vitunj, with 48 family households.

External links 
  (in Croatian)

References 

Populated places in Karlovac County